The Eastern Michigan Eagles men's basketball team represents Eastern Michigan University in Ypsilanti, Michigan. The team currently competes in the West division of the Mid-American Conference (MAC). They have appeared in four NCAA Division I tournaments and have a 3–4 record, tied for third best among Michigan colleges. They reached the Sweet Sixteen in the 1991 NCAA Division I men's basketball tournament and defeated the Duke Blue Devils in the first round of the 1996 tournament.

EMU has competed in the MAC since joining in 1972, and previously competed in the Michigan Intercollegiate Athletic Association (1920–1926). The team last played in the NCAA tournament in 1998.

History

Ben Braun era
Ben Braun served as head coach of the EMU men's basketball team from 1985 to 1996, before leaving to take over the head coaching duties at the University of California-Berkeley. In his 10 ½ seasons as EMU head coach, he led Eastern to its most successful decade as an NCAA Division I school, finishing as the winningest head coach in EMU history with a 185–132 record. During his tenure he was named Mid-American Conference Coach of the Year three times (1987–88, 1990–91, 1995–96). Those three seasons saw the Eagles win Mid-American Conference and MAC tournament championships and NCAA post-season tournament appearances, including a "Sweet 16" appearance in 1990–91. He also coached the 1994–95 team to EMU's first-ever National Invitation Tournament (NIT).

Milton Barnes era
Following the departure of Ben Braun to California, Eastern Michigan hired Milton Barnes, he would spend four season as a head coach, earning 63 victories in those years.

Jim Boone era
In 2001, EMU hired Jim Boone to lead its basketball program. Boone compiled a 48–96 record in 5 seasons at the helm.

Charles Ramsey era
Ypsilanti native and EMU graduate Charles Ramsey was hired following the 2005 season. In his first game as head coach, Ramsey pulled off an upset over a Ben Braun coached California team, however that would be the highlight of his stint as head coach in Ypsilanti. After a 68–118 record in six years at the helm, EMU would fire Ramsey after the 2010–11 basketball season.

Rob Murphy era
Rob Murphy, a Detroit native was hired in the spring of 2011 to take over for Charles Ramsey. Prior to EMU, Murphy spent seven years as an assistant coach at Syracuse under Jim Boeheim. In his first season, Murphy would lead the Eagles to a 14–18 record. However, with its 9–7 record in conference play, the Eagles took 1st place in the MAC-West. In 2021, he left the team to join the Motor City Cruise of the NBA G League as president and general manager.

Postseason

NCAA Tournament Division I results 
The Eagles have appeared in four NCAA Division I Tournaments. Their combined record is 3–4.

Coach Ben Braun led Eastern Michigan to their first three NCAA Division I tournament appearances during his 11-year tenure. One of the great highlights in team history came after EMU's first round victory over Duke in 1996, when the Blue Devils' Head Coach Mike Krzyzewski stated, "Eastern Michigan is very well coached, much deeper than we are and, today, much quicker than we were."

NIT results 
The Eagles have appeared in one National Invitation Tournament (NIT). Their record is 0–1.

CBI results 
The Eagles have appeared in the College Basketball Invitational (CBI) one time. Their record is 0–1.

CIT results 
The Eagles have appeared in the CollegeInsider.com Postseason Tournament (CIT) two times. Their combined record is 2–2.

NCAA Division II Tournament results 
The Eagles have appeared in the NCAA Division II tournament one time. Their record is 3–2.

EMU reached the Final Four of the 1972 NCAA College Division National Championship, led by All-American George Gervin, an NBA Hall of Famer selected as one of the 50 Greatest Players in NBA History.

NAIA District 23 playoff

NAIA National Division I Tournament

Mid-American Conference tournament Results

Championships

NCAA Tournament 
Appearances (4)
 1988
 1991
 1996
 1998
Sweet Sixteen (1)
 1991

NAIA District 23 (4) 
 1968
 1969
 1970
 1971

NAIA National Division I Tournament 
Elite Eight (2)
 1968
 1971
Semifinals (1)
 1971
Finals (1)
 1971

NCAA Division II Tournament 
Elite Eight (1)
 1972
Final Four (1)
 1972
Third Place game (1)
 1972

MAC regular season champions (4) 
 1988
 1991
 1996
 2012 (MAC West)

Mid-American Conference tournament 
Finals (5)
 1991
 1995
 1996
 1997
 1998
Champions (4)
 1988
 1991
 1996
 1998

Michigan Intercollegiate Athletic Association championships 
 1921

Michigan Normal championships 
 1908

All-time win–loss record 
Source:

Players 
Players Drafted & Undrafted in the NBA and NBA-DL

*NBA-DL

Current pro players 
Da'Shonte Riley  – Salt Lake City Stars

Karrington Ward  – Oklahoma City Blue

Raven Lee  – Santa Cruz Warriors

Retired numbers

Awards

MAC Awards

MAC Player of the Year 
 1988 Grant Long
 1991 Marcus Kennedy

MAC Defensive Player of the Year 
 2014 Da'Shonte Riley

Academic All-MAC 
 1975–76 Dan Hoff
 1975–76 Walt Jones
 1981 Patrick Miller
 1998 Nkechi Ezugwu
 2003 Steve Pettyjohn
 2014 Daylen Harrison
 2015 Olalekan Ajayi
 2015 Trent Perry
 2016 Trent Perry
 2017 Blake Brown
 2017 Nick Madray
 2017 James Thompson IV

MAC Tournament MVP 
 1988 Grant Long
 1991 Marcus Kennedy
 1996 Brian Tolbert
 1998 Earl Boykins

1st Team All-MAC 
 1981 Jeff Zatkoff
 1985 Fred Cofield
 1987 Grant Long
 1988 Grant Long
 1991 Marcus Kennedy
 1991 Lorenzo Neely
 1992 Kory Hallas
 1994 Kareem Carpenter
 1995 Brian Tolbert
 1996 Brian Tolbert
 1997 Earl Boykins
 1998 Earl Boykins
 2006 John Bowler
 2018 James Thompson IV

2nd Team All-MAC 
 1975 Bob Riddle
 1979 Gary Green
 1980 Kelvin Blakely
 1982 Jeff Zatkoff
 1984 Fred Cofield
 1984 Vince Giles
 1986 Percy Cooper
 1987 Mike McCall
 1988 Howard Chambers
 1990 Lorenzo Neely
 1991 Carl Thomas
 1993 Ellery Morgan
 1995 Kareem Carpenter
 1996 Earl Boykins
 1997 Derrick Dial
 1998 Derrick Dial
 2003 Ryan Prillman
 2009 Brandon Bowdry
 2010 Carlos Medlock
 2010 Brandon Bowdry
 2011 Brandon Bowdry
 2016 James Thompson IV
 2017 James Thompson IV
 2019 James Thompson IV

3rd Team All-MAC 
 2012 Darrell Lampley
 2014 Karrington Ward
 2015 Ray Lee
 2018 Elijah Minnie

MAC Honorable Mention 
 1975 Dan Hoff
 1976 Bob Riddle
 1977 Bill Weaver
 1978 Ken Harmon
 1978 Gary Green
 1980 Jeff Zatkoff
 1981 Tim Bracey
 1982 Jack Brusewitz
 1983 Phil Blevins
 1983 Marlow McClain
 1983 Vince Giles
 1985 Vince Giles
 1988 Lorenzo Neely
 1989 Howard Chambers
 1989 Lorenzo Neely
 1990 Kory Hallas
 1993 Bryant Kennedy
 1993 Theron Wilson
 1996 Theron Wilson
 1998 James Head
 2000 Calvin Warner
 2005 John Bowler
 2008 Carlos Medlock
 2010 Justin Dobbins
 2013 Glenn Bryant
 2015 Karrington Ward
 2016 Ray Lee
 2018 Paul Jackson
 2019 Paul Jackson
 2019 Elijah Minnie
 2020 Boubacar Toure

MAC All-Freshman team 
 1988 Lorenzo Neely
 1989 Kory Hallas
 1995 Earl Boykins
 2000 C.J. Grantham
 2006 Carlos Medlock
 2007 Brandon Bowdry
 2016 James Thompson IV

MAC All-Defensive team 
 2016 Tim Bond
 2017 Tim Bond
 2018 James Thompson IV
 2019 James Thompson IV

MAC West Player of the Week 
 Dec. 28, 2003 John Bowler
 Nov. 10, 2006 Carlos Medlock
 Jan. 01, 2007 Jesse Bunkley
 Nov. 13, 2007 Carlos Medlock
 Nov. 21, 2011 Darrell Lampley
 Feb. 27, 2012 Darrell Lampley
 Dec. 16, 2013 Ray Lee
 Feb. 17, 2014 Da'Shonte Riley
 Nov. 24, 2014 Ray Lee
 Feb. 16, 2015 Karrington Ward
 Mar. 07, 2015 Mike Talley
 Feb. 15, 2016 James Thompson IV
 Mar. 05, 2016 Tim Bond
 Nov. 28, 2016 James Thompson IV
 Jan. 03, 2017 Jordan Nobles
 Dec. 18, 2018 James Thompson IV

Preseason 1st Team All-MAC West Division 
 2004 John Bowler
 2005 John Bowler
 2015 Ray Lee
 2016 James Thompson IV
 2017 James Thompson IV

MAC Coach of the Year 
 1988 Ben Braun
 1991 Ben Braun
 1996 Ben Braun
 2012 Rob Murphy

MAC Freshman Of The Year 
 1988 Lorenzo Neely
 2016 James Thompson IV

MAC All-Tournament Team 
 1987 Grant Long
 1988 Grant Long
 1988 Lorenzo Neely
 1991 Lorenzo Neely
 1991 Marcus Kennedy
 1995 Brian Tolbert
 1995 Theron Wilson
 1996 Brian Tolbert
 1996 Earl Boykins
 1996 Theron Wilson
 1997 Derrick Dial
 1998 Earl Boykins
 1998 Derrick Dial
 2010 Carlos Medlock

National Awards 
Co-Coach of the Year in the NCAA District 14 Division I
 2012 Rob Murphy

Honorable Mention All-American
 1998 Earl Boykins
Cosida Academic All-American Selections 2nd Team
 1976 Dan Hoff
Frances Pomeroy Naismith Award
 1998 Earl Boykins

USA Basketball Male Athlete of the Year
 1997 Earl Boykins

Thompson Challenge All Tournament Team
 2006 Carlos Medlock
Golden Bear Classic
 2006 Brandon Bowdry
Texas A&M Corpus Christi Islander Invitational
 2007 Carlos Medlock
Hoosier Tipoff Classic All-Tournament Team
 2017 Elijah Minnie
E-Club Hall of Fame
 2014 Lorenzo Neely
 2013 Earl Boykins
 2013 Derrick Dial
 2012 Brian Tolbert
 2008 Lindell Reason
 2007 Al Jagutis
 2006 Gary Tyson
 2005 Ben Braun
 2005 Harold Simons
 2004 Earl Dixon
 2003 Jim Dutcher
 2000 Jack Brusewitz
 1998 Grant Long
 1997 Earle Higgins
 1996 Kennedy McIntosh
 1994 Robert Sims
 1994 C.P. Steimle
 1993 Joe Brodie
 1993 George Gervin
 1993 Nick Manych
 1992 Cleon Gilliam
 1992 Leo Turner
 1991 James Ross
 1991 Claude Snarey
 1989 William M. Cave
 1989 Ron Gulyas
 1988 Sherm J. Collins
 1987 William J. Stephens
 1985 Charles Paige
 1983 Charles Lappeus
 1983 Neville "Tex" Walker
 1982 Clifford D. Crane
 1982 Marvin R. Mittlestat
 1979 Louis Batterson
 1979 Harvey Marlatt
 1979 George Muellich
 1979 Arthur D. Walker
 1979 Frank "Buck" Weeber
 1978 William E. Crouch
 1978 Daniel Webster Kirksey
 1978 James A. Walsh
 1977 C. Dale Curtiss
 1977 Harry Ockerman
 1976 Edwin Shadford
 1976 Raymond L. Stites

All-Freshman Team
 1994 Earl Boykins

UPI 1st Team NCAA-College Division All-America 
 1971 George Gervin

Coaches 1st Team NCAA-College Division All-America 
 1971 George Gervin

NAIA second-team All-District 23
 1971 Earl Dixon

NAIA honorable mention All-America
 1971 Earl Dixon

1st Team All-Interstate Intercollegiate Athletic Conference
 1952 Daniel Webster Kirksey
 1954 Daniel Webster Kirksey

2nd Team All-Interstate Intercollegiate Athletic Conference
 1951 Daniel Webster Kirksey
 1952 Cleon Gilliam
 1957 William J. Stephens
 1960 Ron Gulyas

NAIA All-Star State of Michigan Team
 1957 William J. Stephens

Michigan Collegiate Conference Honors
 1928 George Muellich

vs Michigan Universities 
 Central Michigan University (MAC) 91–100 All-Time
 Western Michigan University (MAC) 36–58 All-Time
 University of Michigan (B1G) 3–27 All-Time
 Michigan State University (B1G) 4–29 All-Time
 University of Detroit Mercy (Horizon) 19–61 All-Time
 Oakland University (Horizon) 10–6 All-Time
*As of Jan. 06, 2016

Statistics

National statistical champions 
 2013/14 NCAA Statistical Championship for field goal percentage defense (36.9%)

MAC Statistical Champions Team Season 
 1986/87 Best 3-point field goal percentage Season (.465)
 1987 scoring offense (76.8)
 1987 rebounding (36.1)
 1987 three-point field goal Pct. (.465)
 1987 three-point field goals made (144)
 1988 scoring offense (82.6)
 1989 scoring offense (77.7)
 1991 field goal percentage (.514)
 1991 free throw percentage (.727)
 1996 scoring offense (83.7)
 1997 field goal percentage (.495)
 1998 scoring offense (79.8)
 1998 rebounding (37.4)
 1998 three-point field goals made (210)
 2012 scoring defense (58.7)
 2013 scoring defense (59.1)
 2014 scoring defense (61.4)
 2014 field goal percentage defense (.369)
 2014 blocked shots (6 Avg/G)
 2014 turnover maring (+3.57)
 2014 scoring defense (61.4)
 2015 blocked shots (4.5 Avg/G)
 2015 field goal percentage defense (.386)
 2015 steals (305/8.7)
 2015 turnover margin (+3.31)
 2016 steals (312/9.5)
 2016 turnover margin (+3.15)

MAC individual statistical champion 
 1965 Dave Anderson  – free throw percentage (.863)
 1977 Bill Weaver – free throw percentage (.826)
 1986 Percy Cooper – assists (182/6.7)
 1987 Deron Goheen – 3-point field goal percentage (.532)
 1987 Brad Soucie – 3-point FG made per game (2.48)
 1987 Mike McCaskill – field goal percentage (.594)
 1988 Lorenzo Neely – steals (71/2.4)
 1989 Lorenzo Neely – steals (78/2.7)
 1989 Brian Nolan – blocked shots (50/2.0)
 1990 Brian Nolan – blocked shots (49/1.5)
 1991 Marcus Kennedy – scoring (659/20.0)
 1991 Carl Thomas – 3-point FG made per game (2.70)
 1991 Marcus Kennedy – field goal percentage (.682)
 1993 Theron Wilson – blocked shots (80/2.7)
 1994 James Reed-assists (140/5.2
 1995 Early Boykins – assists (136/4.5)
 1995 Theron Wilson – blocked shots (96/3.2)
 1998 Earl Boykins – scoring (746/25.7)
 1998 Earl Boykins – 3-point FG made per game (2.74)
 2005 Michael Ross – free throw percentage (.854)
 Carlos Medlock – best 3-point field goal percentage (game), 6–6 vs. WMU, 2-15-06
 2006 John Bowler – scoring (563/20.1)
 2006 John Bowler – rebounding (301/10.8)
 2010 Brandon Bowdry – rebounding (319/10.0)
 2010 Justin Dobbins – field goal percentage (.615)
 2011 Brandon Bowdry – rebounding (284/9.5)
 2015 Mike Talley – assist/turnover ratio (2.3)
 2016 Tim Bond – steals (67/2.0)
 2016 James Thompson IV – rebounding (352/10.7)
 2016 James Thompson IV – field goal percentage (.645)

MAC tournament records

Individual single game 
 1980 Greg Floyd – field goal pct. (1.000/7-7)
 1984 Fred Cofield – field goals attempted (28)

Individual tournament career 
 Earl Boykins – field goals made (34)
 Earl Boykins – field goal attempts (60)

Team 
 1998 field goals made (41 v Toledo)

References

External links
 
 Basketball reference